Solea is the third (and final) novel of French author Jean-Claude Izzo's Marseilles Trilogy.

References

1998 French novels
French crime novels
Novels about organized crime
Novels set in Marseille